Pickles (born 1962 or 1963; died 1967) was a black and white collie dog, known for his role in finding the stolen Jules Rimet Trophy in March 1966, four months before the 1966 FIFA World Cup was scheduled to kick off in England.

Trophy theft

The World Cup trophy was stolen on the afternoon of Sunday 20 March 1966.  It had been on public display in a glass cabinet during the "Sport with Stamps" Stanley Gibbons Stampex rare stamp exhibition at Methodist Central Hall in Westminster. The thief evaded the round-the-clock security, and ignored rare stamps with a value of £3 million to steal the silver-gilt trophy, which was generally thought to be worth far less.

A telephone call from a man who called himself "Jackson" to Joe Mears, chairman of Chelsea F.C. and The Football Association, alerted him that a package would be left at Stamford Bridge the following day: it contained a £15,000 ransom demand, accompanied by the removable lining from the top of the trophy. The package was turned over to the police, who arranged to meet "Jackson". However, when they arrested the man who had mailed the package, whose real name was Edward Betchley, he claimed that he was a middleman, and that the real culprit was a man he called "The Pole". Betchley was eventually convicted for demanding money with menace, and sentenced to two years' imprisonment. If indeed there were other persons involved in the theft, no one else has ever been found.

Recovery
The rest of the trophy was found on Sunday 27 March, just seven days after it was stolen, wrapped in newspaper lying by the front wheel of a parked car in Beulah Hill, Upper Norwood, South London, by the four-year-old Pickles, while taking a walk with his owner, David Corbett, who worked as a Thames lighterman. Corbett briefly fell under suspicion of involvement in the theft. When England won the trophy, Pickles was invited to the celebration banquet as a reward.

Corbett collected nearly £5,000 as a reward. He used the money to buy a house in Lingfield, Surrey, in 1967. Pickles was awarded the silver medal of the National Canine Defence League.

The Football Association had a replica of the cup made in base metal, for publicity use, so the gold original could be kept safe.  The original cup was awarded permanently to Brazil after the 1970 FIFA World Cup, but was stolen from the headquarters of Brazilian Football Confederation in Rio de Janeiro in December 1983 and never recovered.  The replica was bought by FIFA at auction in 1997 for £254,000, and it is held by the National Football Museum in Manchester.

Later life
Pickles starred with Eric Sykes and June Whitfield in the 1966 film The Spy with a Cold Nose. He also appeared on several television programmes, including Blue Peter. He was named "Dog of the Year", and awarded a year of free food by pet food manufacturer Spillers.

Pickles died in 1967 when he was strangled by his choke chain lead that caught on a tree branch while he was chasing a cat near his new home in Surrey. He was buried in his owner's back garden, and his collar is on display in the National Football Museum in Manchester.

Legacy

A fictional version of the story was told in a 2006 ITV drama written by Michael Chaplin, called Pickles: The Dog Who Won The World Cup. Pickles was voiced by Harry Enfield.

A plaque was installed during England's 2018 World Cup campaign, in woodland near the spot where Pickles found the trophy on Beulah Hill, Upper Norwood. The plaque was commissioned and put up by Adam Thoroughgood, a local resident. It was later relocated to the doorway of the St Valery flats.

See also
 List of individual dogs

References

Further reading
 The Theft of the Jules Rimet Trophy: The Hidden History of the 1966 World Cup, Martin Atherton, Meyer & Meyer Verlag, 2008,  
 Super Dogs: Heart-warming Adventures of the World’s Greatest Dogs, Malcolm Croft, Summersdale Publishers, 2014, 

1967 animal deaths
Individual dogs
1960s animal births